Tip is a public art work by American artist David Middlebrook, located in the Riverwest neighborhood north of downtown Milwaukee, Wisconsin.  The sculpture was created for Gordon Park as part of a revitalization initiative.

Description
Serving as an entrance arch at the northwest corner of the park, Tip stands on either side of an asphalt path. The work has three primary elements: a thumbprint-stamped basalt column, a sky-slicing net of iconic symbols cast in bronze, and a carved white Italian marble iceberg topped with a large anvil and delicate tree branch. The work's imagery invites viewers "into a dream-like narrative dealing with the geological and cultural history of the location."

References

Outdoor sculptures in Milwaukee
2004 sculptures
Bronze sculptures in Wisconsin
Stone sculptures in Wisconsin
Marble sculptures in the United States